The Brunswick and Pensacola Railroad was a logging line established in 1894.  Owned by the Suwannee Canal Company, the railroad ran from Folkston, Georgia, to the Suwanee Canal on the East edge of the Okefenokee Swamp near Camp Cornelia, Georgia.

Logging railroads in the United States
Defunct Georgia (U.S. state) railroads
American companies established in 1894
Railway companies established in 1894
1894 establishments in Georgia (U.S. state)